Christmas with Babyface is the fifth studio album by American singer Babyface. It was released by Epic Records on October 27, 1998 in the United States. The album is a follow-up to his first live album, MTV Unplugged NYC 1997 (1997), as well as his first Christmas album. Produced by Walter Afanasieff, Christmas with Babyface consists of ten tracks, featuring one original song, "You Were There," and ten cover versions of Christmas standards and carols. It peaked at number 101 on the US Billboard 200 and number 34 on the US Top R&B/Hip-Hop Albums.

Critical reception

AllMusic editor Leo Stanley wrote that "those years he spent perfecting his style were put to good use – not only did he turn into a reliable hitmaker, but he developed an alluring, mellow sound that appealed to all generations of listeners, which is exactly what is needed for a successful holiday album. And Christmas with Babyface is exactly that – a warm, friendly, and inviting holiday record, with enough soul for younger listeners and enough style for old folks. It may not be a classic, but it is a lovely record ideal for romantic winter nights or relaxed holiday parties."

Track listing 
All tracks were produced by Walter Afanasieff; except "You Were There," produced by Babyface.

Charts

Certifications

References

Babyface (musician) albums
1998 Christmas albums
Christmas albums by American artists
Contemporary R&B Christmas albums
Albums produced by Babyface (musician)
Albums produced by Walter Afanasieff
Epic Records albums